Baron Zsigmond Perényi de Perény (25 November 1870 – 18 March 1946) was a Hungarian politician, who served as Interior Minister in 1919. During the Hungarian Soviet Republic, he was arrested by the communists. He was the governor of the Governorate of Subcarpathia (Kárpátaljai Kormányzóság) between 28 June 1939 and 12 September 1940. As Crown Guard, he was a member of the House of Magnates, later Speaker of this assembly. In 1944, he resigned because of the appointment of the cabinet of Ferenc Szálasi's Hungarist Arrow Cross Party).

References
 Magyar Életrajzi Lexikon

1870 births
1946 deaths
People from Pest, Hungary
Hungarian Interior Ministers
Speakers of the House of Magnates
Zsigmond